Hallet may refer to:

People
André Hallet (1890–1959), Belgian painter
Étienne Sulpice Hallet (1755–1825), French-born American architect
Gérard Hallet (born 1946), French footballer
Gilles Hallet (1620–1694), Flemish Baroque painter
Jean-Pierre Hallet (1927–2004), Belgian ethnologist, naturalist, and humanitarian
Jim Hallet (born 1960), American golfer
John Hallet, British actor
Judith Dwan Hallet (born 1941), American filmmaker

Places
 Hallet Township, Hodgeman County, Kansas, U.S.
 Hallet Valley, valley in Victoria Land, Antarctica

See also
 
 Hallett (disambiguation)